The Christian Liberal Alliance (ACL), also known as the PNL-PDL Alliance, was a centre-right electoral alliance in Romania.

The alliance was founded on 28 July 2014 by the National Liberal Party (PNL) and Democratic Liberal Party (PDL) prior to a planned future merger between the two parties in order to field a joint presidential candidate in the 2014 presidential election. In August 2014, the parties selected Klaus Iohannis, PNL party president and mayor of Sibiu, as presidential candidate.

In the first round of the 2014 presidential election held on 2 November 2014, ACL candidate Iohannis received 30.4% of the vote, coming in second place behind Victor Ponta, the Social Democratic Party (PSD) candidate and incumbent Prime Minister of Romania. In the runoff election held on 16 November 2014, Iohannis received 54.5% of the vote, becoming the surprise victor of the Romanian presidency. The alliance was disbanded on 17 November 2014 upon the merger of PNL and PDL.

Electoral history

Presidential elections

References

Political parties established in 2014
Conservative parties in Romania
Defunct political party alliances in Romania
2014 establishments in Romania
National Liberal Party (Romania)